Chigorin can refer to:

 Mikhail Chigorin (1850–1908), Russian chess player
 Chigorin Defense, a chess opening
 Chigorin Memorial, a chess tournament
 7268 Chigorin, a minor planet

Surnames of Russian origin